In archaeology, a sherd, or more precisely, potsherd, is commonly a historic or prehistoric fragment of pottery, although the term is occasionally used to refer to fragments of stone and glass vessels, as well.

Occasionally, a piece of broken pottery may be referred to as a shard. While the spelling 'shard' is generally reserved for referring to fragments of glass vessels, the term does not exclude pottery fragments. The etymology is connected with the idea of breakage, from Old English sceard, related to Old Norse skarð, "notch", and Middle High German schart,  "notch".

A sherd or potsherd that has been used by having writing painted or inscribed on it can be more precisely referred to as an ostracon.

The analysis of sherds is widely used by archaeologists to date sites and develop chronologies, due to their diagnostic characteristics and high resistance to natural, destructive processes. Some characteristics of sherds useful to archaeologists include temper, form, and glaze. These characteristics can be used to determine the kinds of resources and technologies used at the site.

Types
Archaeologists often classify sherds by the part of the ceramic vessel from which the sherd came. For example, sherds may be categorized as rim sherds, body sherds, and/or base sherds. Rim sherds are fragments of a vessel's rim, while base sherds are fragments of the vessel's base. Body sherds are fragments of ceramic that are not identified as rim sherds or base sherds. Other categories might include fragments of handles or lids.

While all types of sherds carry valuable information, rim sherds and base sherds are especially informative because they allow archaeologists to determine the shape of the original object.

References

Further reading
Shepard, Anna O. (1956) Ceramics for the Archaeologist. Carnegie Institution of Washington.
Rice, Prudence M. (1987) Pottery Analysis. University of Chicago Press.

External links

Pottery Sherds

Pottery
Archaeological artefact types
Egyptian artefact types